"A" Fort and Battery Hill Redoubt-Camp Early, also known as Measles Fort, is a historic American Civil War military facility and redoubt located in Fairfax County, Virginia south of Centreville and along Bull Run.

It was listed on the National Register of Historic Places in 1998.

References

Forts on the National Register of Historic Places in Virginia
Government buildings completed in 1862
National Register of Historic Places in Fairfax County, Virginia
Forts in Virginia
1862 establishments in Virginia
American Civil War on the National Register of Historic Places